Fluticasone propionate, sold under the brand names Flovent and Flonase among others, is a steroid medication. When inhaled it is used for the long term management of asthma and COPD. In the nose it is used for hay fever and nasal polyps. It can also be used for mouth ulcers. It works by decreasing inflammation.

Common side effects when inhaled include upper respiratory tract infections, sinusitis, thrush, and cough. Common side effects when used in the nose include nosebleeding and sore throat. 

Fluticasone propionate was patented in 1980, and approved for medical use in 1990. It is available as a generic medication. In 2020, fluticasone was the 23rd most commonly prescribed medication in the United States, with more than 24million prescriptions.

Medical uses
Fluticasone propionate is used by powder or aerosol inhalation for the prophylaxis of asthma. The nasal spray is used for prevention and treatment of allergic rhinitis. Nasal drops are used in the treatment of nasal polyps. The nasal spray can also be used in the mouth for mouth ulcers.

Fluticasone propionate in a topical form can be used to treat skin conditions such as eczema, psoriasis, and rashes.

Adverse effects
If taken correctly, the nasal spray and oral inhaler formulation have fewer corticosteroid side effects than the tablet formulation because they limit systemic (blood) absorption. However, systemic absorption is not negligible even with correct administration. Using the spray or inhaler at higher than recommended doses or with other corticosteroids can increase the risk for serious, systemic corticosteroid induced side effects. These side effects include weakened immune system, increased risk of systemic infections, osteoporosis, and elevated pressure in the eyes.

Nasal spray

Common side effects may include nasal irritation (burning, stinging, bleeding), headache, upset stomach (nausea, vomiting), and diarrhea. Rare side effects include infection (evidenced by, for example, fever, sore throat, and cough), vision problems, severe swelling, hoarse voice, and difficulty breathing or swallowing.

Inhaled
Common side effects may include upper respiratory tract infection, throat irritation, thrush, cough, and headache. Rare side effects include bruising, swelling of the face/neck, depression, tiredness, and shortness of breath.

Pharmacology

Fluticasone propionate is a highly selective agonist at the glucocorticoid receptor with negligible activity at androgen, estrogen, or mineralocorticoid receptors, thereby producing anti-inflammatory and vasoconstriction effects. It has been shown to have a wide range of inhibitory effects on multiple cell types (e.g. mast cell, eosinophil, neutrophil, macrophages, and lymphocytes) and mediators (e.g. histamine, eicosanoids, leukotrienes, and cytokines) involved in inflammation. Fluticasone propionate is stated to exert a topical effect on the lungs without significant systemic effects at usual doses, due to its low systemic bioavailability.

Interactions
Fluticasone propionate is broken down by CYP3A4 (Cytochrome P450 3A4), and has been shown to interact with strong CYP3A4 inhibitors such as ritonavir and ketoconazole.

Ritonavir is a common drug used in the treatment of HIV. Coadministration of ritonavir and fluticasone may lead to increased levels of fluticasone in the body, which may lead to Cushing's Syndrome and adrenal insufficiency.

Ketoconazole, an antifungal drug, has also been shown to increase fluticasone concentration leading to systemic corticosteroid side effects.

See also
Fluticasone

References

External links
 
 
 

Antiasthmatic drugs
Corticosteroid esters
Drugs acting on the respiratory system
Haleon
Glucocorticoids
Nasal sprays
Organofluorides
Propionate esters
Respiratory therapy
Thioesters
Wikipedia medicine articles ready to translate